The Zoo de Cerza (formally parc zoologique Cerza) is a  zoo that opened in 1986 in Hermival-les-Vaux, Calvados, France.

The zoo is home to some 1000 animals representing about 120 species, and is a member of the European Association of Zoos and Aquaria (EAZA) and the World Association of Zoos and Aquariums (WAZA).

External links

 (in French)

Zoos in France
Buildings and structures in Calvados (department)
Tourist attractions in Calvados (department)
Zoos established in 1986
Organizations based in Normandy